Coryphophylax subcristatus, the short-crested bay island forest lizard, is an agamid lizard found in the Andaman and Nicobar Islands. It does not occur south of 7° 11' 58.94" N (as of Aug 2004).

References

 Blyth, E. 1860 J. Asiatic Soc. Bengal 29: 23.
 Boulenger, G.A. 1885 Catalogue of the Lizards in the British Museum (Nat. Hist.) I. Geckonidae, Eublepharidae, Uroplatidae, Pygopodidae, Agamidae. London: 450 pp.
 Krishnan, S. 2005.  PHYLOGENETIC STATUS AND SYSTEMATICS OF THE AGAMID CORYPHOPHYLAX BLYTH, 1861 (REPTILIA: SQUAMATA). unpublished Masters Thesis - University of Texas at Arlington.

External links
 Reptile database
 http://www.uta.edu/faculty/shreyas/research.htm Shreyas Krishnan's research page

Coryphophylax
Fauna of the Andaman and Nicobar Islands
Reptiles of India
Reptiles described in 1861
Taxa named by Edward Blyth